Pokrówka  is a village in Chełm County, Lublin Voivodeship, in eastern Poland. It is the seat of the gmina (administrative district) called Gmina Chełm.

The village has a population of 1,594.

References

Villages in Chełm County